Eresina fontainei, the Fontaine's eresina, is a butterfly in the family Lycaenidae. It is found in Sierra Leone, Ivory Coast, Cameroon, the Democratic Republic of the Congo (Sankuru), Uganda, western Kenya, north-western Tanzania and possibly Nigeria. Its habitat consists of dense, primary forests.

References

Butterflies described in 1956
Poritiinae